Box and Cox Publications, known as Box & Cox, was a music publisher who had offices at number 7, Denmark Street.  Their greatest hit was "I've Got a Lovely Bunch of Coconuts".  The principals were Elton Box (1903–1981) and Desmond Cox (1903–1966).  Bill Martin, who worked in "Tin Pan Alley" at the time, recalled their manner, 'And they had a piano.  You would be invited to play them your song, and then afterwards, one of them would say, "What do you think Mr Box?" and the reply would be "I'm not sure Mr Cox".  They then asked you if you had a song like "A Lovely Bunch of Coconuts".  They would do things for a laugh and give you money...'

References

Music publishing companies of the United Kingdom